A total lunar eclipse took place on Thursday, April 4, 1996, the first of two total lunar eclipses in 1996, the other being on Friday, September 27. The moon passed through the center of the Earth's shadow.

This was the last central member and 55th overall member of Lunar Saros 122. The previous event was the March 1978 lunar eclipse. The next event was the April 2014 lunar eclipse.

This eclipse was the first of an almost tetrad (that occurred when there were 4 consecutive lunar eclipses that had an umbral eclipse magnitude of 0.9 or greater). The others were 27 Sep 1996 (T), 24 Mar 1997 (P) and 16 Sep 1997 (T).

Visibility 

It could be seen completely over Africa, and Europe, seen rising over North and South America, and setting over Western Asia.

Gallery

Related eclipses

Eclipses of 1996 
 A total lunar eclipse on April 4.
 A partial solar eclipse on April 17.
 A total lunar eclipse on September 27.
 A partial solar eclipse on October 12.

Lunar year series 

This is the second of four lunar year eclipses at the ascending node of the moon's orbit.

Half-Saros cycle
A lunar eclipse will be preceded and followed by solar eclipses by 9 years and 5.5 days (a half saros). This lunar eclipse is related to two hybrid solar eclipses of Solar Saros 129.

See also 
List of lunar eclipses
List of 20th-century lunar eclipses

References

External links 
 Saros cycle 122
 Andrés Valencia: Total Lunar Eclipse - April 3 '96
 

1996-04
1996 in science
April 1996 events